It Couldn't Happen to a Nicer Guy is a 1974 American made-for-television black comedy film starring Paul Sorvino and JoAnna Cameron. The film was co-written and produced by Arne Sultan as an ABC Movie of the Week installment.

Plot
Harry Walters, a stout real estate salesman who is randomly picked up by a beautiful woman, Wanda Olivia Wellman, then raped at gunpoint as a prank. He is later dropped off naked in a small town and left to explain to his wife, friends, and the police how he was both kidnapped and raped by a woman.

Cast
Paul Sorvino as Harry Walters. 
Michael Learned as Janet Walters. 
Bob Dishy as Ed Huxley
Adam Arkin as Ken Walters
Eddie Barth as Sgt. Riggs
Roger Bowen as Stu Dotney
Carl Franklin as Hovey
Diane Cary as Diane Civita
JoAnna Cameron as Wanda Olivia Wellman

Notes

External links
 

1974 television films
1974 films
1970s black comedy films
American black comedy films
ABC Movie of the Week
Films about rape
American drama television films
1970s American films